R. B. J. "Rob" Walker (born 1947) is a professor in the Department of Political Science at the University of Victoria, Canada, and PUC-Rio. He is the founding co-editor, with Didier Bigo, of the journal International Political Sociology, and long-term editor of the journal Alternatives: Global, Local, Political. With his colleague Warren Magnusson, he is a founding member of UVIC's interdisciplinary Graduate Program in Cultural, Social and Political Thought. His work, while critical of international relations and political theory disciplines, addresses a broad range of problematics bound up with practices and theories of spatiotemporality, boundaries, and sovereignties.

Borders and boundaries
Walker has written extensively on the logic of "inside/outside", a dichotomy which enables and frames international relations and its theorizations. For Walker, border practices and boundary discourses, spatial demarcations and conceptualizations of here/there and us/them, operate as important sites for understanding these "inside/outside" logics. Vaughan-Williams, assessing the study of borders within international relations disciplines, praises Walker's work for "offering the most sustained engagement with the problem of borders, especially the relationship between the concept of the border of the state and sovereignty, at the intersection of IR and political theory."

State sovereignty

Perhaps Walker's largest body of work is on the topic of state sovereignty. Because modern theories of international relations were created in a time when state sovereignty was a given cornerstone of political theorizing, modernist theorists continue this trend, despite it becoming increasingly less apparent. Though Walker denies cosmopolitanism and the assumption that state sovereignty will eventually be a thing of the past, he stresses the importance of Modern theorists to acknowledge the decline of a states ability to act autonomously within its own fixed borders. The European Union is an excellent example of states that are slowly losing sovereignty in a way many traditional IR theorists fail to realize.

Political theory
One of Walker's biggest contributions to international relations discourse is his analysis of theories. Walker rejects the dichotomy between theory and practice, where epistemology is favoured over ontology. Practice is "theory-laden", inseparable, and a different theoretical approach will reveal different practical outcomes. It is no small wonder that Walker describes Realism and its tenancies (often afflicted by a negative perception of mankind) in a negative light: "As it informs a rather large and influential literature on geopolitics and military affairs, realism has often degenerated into little more than an antipolitical apology for cynicism and physical force." For Walker, the use of such a theory leads to increasingly negative and cynical practice.

Postmodernism
Walker is often cited as being a postmodernist thinker, bringing postmodernism into the eye of scholars alongside Richard Ashley. Despite countless theorists and scholars saying otherwise, Walker himself does not claim to be a postmodernist, but rather rejects this principal. Walker, being more concerned with theories themselves and the spatial-temporal factors of their creation, sees postmodernism not as theory separate from modern theories, but simply a product of its own inception. In this sense postmodernism is not the answer to modernism, but the continuation thereof.

Bibliography
 Inside/Outside: International Relations as Political Theory (Cambridge: Cambridge University Press, 1993).
 One World, Many Worlds: Struggles For A Just World Peace (Boulder, CO: Lynne Rienner; London: Zed Books, 1988).
 Out of Line: Boundaries, Borders, Limits (London: Routledge, forthcoming July 2015).
 Europe’s 21st Century Challenge (London: Ashgate, in press for 2010). Coauthored with Didier Bigo, Elspeth Guild and Serge Carerra.
 After the Globe/Before the World (London: Routledge, 2010).

References

Further reading

External links
 Full list of Walker's works on his Uvic webpage
 International Political Sociology home page

Living people
Postmodernists
Paris School (security)
Canadian political scientists
International relations scholars
1947 births